Mi Tren is a light rail network operating in the Bolivian city of Cochabamba, linking the city with Suticollo, El Castillo and San Simon University. The system opened on 13 September 2022, with service beginning on the Red Line and the first phase of the Green Line.

Background
Construction began on the $504 million project in 2017 and it was aimed to be finished in 2020. However, construction work was halted in late 2019 with reports of delayed payments between project promoters and key contractors. As of December 2020, new funding from the state has allowed construction to restart. The first phase of the system comprising the Red Line between Estación Central and UMSS and the Green Line between Estación Central and Quillacollo finally opened on September 13, 2022. The remainder of the Green Line and the Yellow Line are still under construction, with local opposition delaying the Yellow Line.

Lines

Rolling stock
Stadler is due to supply 12 vehicles for the network, with delivery expected in August 2019, and Stadler is to provide three years' maintenance. Reports suggest that the Metelitsa model will be supplied, with the three-section vehicles having capacity for 200 passengers and a maximum speed of 80 km/h.

References

Transport in Bolivia
Rail transport in Bolivia
Tram and light rail transit systems under construction